Croatian History Museum is a museum of history located in the  on Antun Gustav Matoš Street in the historic Gornji Grad district of Zagreb, Croatia. The museum holdings consist of around 300,000 objects divided into 17 collections. In addition to a part of the Meštrović Pavilion, it also administers the Ivan Goran Kovačić Memorial Museum in Lukovdol.

The museum was formed in 1940 as the Croatian National Historic Museum, stemming from the former National Museum, which was formed in 1846 (see also Croatian Natural History Museum).

The museum does not have a permanent display. Instead, it only holds temporary exhibitions due to lack of space. In order to remedy this problem, the building of the Zagreb Tobacco Factory was assigned to the museum in 2007, but as of 2015, the museum remains in Matoš Street. The museum building was damaged in the 2020 Zagreb earthquake and remains closed to visitors as of 2021.

Collection 
The museum holdings are part of 17 collections:

The holdings are housed in the Vojković Palace and part of the Meštrović Pavilion.

Library 
The library of the Croatian History Museum was founded as a department of the National Museum. In 1854, the National Museum library held over 10,000 volumes. It was gradually enlarged through buying and donations, through the work of the National Museum director Spiridon Brusina. At the split of the National Museum into specialised museums, its library was split as well. The library of the Croatian History Museum was in 1959 housed in the museum building in the Vojković Palace, where it remains today. The library contains  20,000 books, including four incunabula and several manuscripts, as well as a number of books printed as early as the 17th century. The primary method of book acquisition are donations and book exchanges, leading to an average of 300 new books yearly.

References

External links 

 

Museums in Zagreb
History museums
Museums established in 1940
Gornji Grad–Medveščak
1940 establishments in Croatia
Historiography of Croatia
Establishments in the Kingdom of Croatia (Habsburg)